Klosterbräu Bamberg is the oldest brewery in Bamberg, Upper Franconia, Germany. It is located in the so-called Mühlenviertel near the river Regnitz. The annual output is about 4,000 hectoliters.

History 
Klosterbräu was named after the nearby Franciscan monastery of Bamberg and was founded as a Prince-Bishopric's dark beer house in 1533. The house was first mentioned as a brewery in 1333. Until 1790, the Bierhaus was owned by the archbishops.

See also 
List of oldest companies

References 
Article contains translated text from Klosterbräu Bamberg on the German Wikipedia retrieved on 25 February 2017.

External links 

Homepage in German
Facebook page

Restaurants in Germany
Bamberg
Companies established in the 16th century
16th-century establishments in the Holy Roman Empire